The Brougher Mansion, at 204 W. Spear St. in Carson City, Nevada, is a historic Queen Anne-style house that was built in 1903–1904.  Also known as the Bath Mansion, it was listed on the National Register of Historic Places in 1904.

It was deemed significant for its architecture, as the only example of its style in Carson City, and for its association with Wilson Brougher, "a man of great enterprise" who rose from poverty to riches.

References 

Houses on the National Register of Historic Places in Nevada
Queen Anne architecture in Nevada
Houses completed in 1904
National Register of Historic Places in Carson City, Nevada
Houses in Carson City, Nevada